St. Joseph Catholic Church, Rectory and Cemetery is a historic church, rectory, and cemetery located at 4983–4985 Bullion Street in the city of Mariposa, in the Sierra foothills of Mariposa County, California.

History
The church was completed in 1863. It was designed in the Carpenter Gothic style, a type of Gothic Revival architecture style that was popular for wooden churches in the United States.

The St. Joseph Catholic Church, Rectory and Cemetery was added to the National Register of Historic Places in 1991.

See also
 National Register of Historic Places listings in Mariposa County, California

References

External links

 
 

Carpenter Gothic church buildings in California
Buildings and structures in Mariposa County, California
Roman Catholic churches in California
Cemeteries in California
Roman Catholic cemeteries in California
Clergy houses in the United States
Roman Catholic churches completed in 1927
National Register of Historic Places in Mariposa County, California
Churches on the National Register of Historic Places in California
20th-century Roman Catholic church buildings in the United States